The Kona Gold Stakes is a Grade III American Thoroughbred horse race for fillies and mares that are three years old or older with allowance conditions, over a distance of six and one half furlongs on the dirt held annually in April at Santa Anita Park, Arcadia, California.  The event currently carries a purse of $100,000.

History

The event was inaugurated on Wednesday, 2 March 1983 as the Potrero Grande Handicap for  horses four year old and older and was won by Hi-Yu Stable's Washington State bred Chinook Pass who was ridden by US Hall of Fame jockey Laffit Pincay Jr.  in a time of 1:14. Chinook Pass would continue on a superb season with several more wins on the Southern California circuit culminating him being crowned as U.S. Champion Sprint Horse for that year.

The event was named after Rancho Potrero Grande, a Mexican land grant in present-day Los Angeles County, California today located nearby in Rosemead and South El Monte, about 6 miles from Santa Anita Racetrack in Arcadia.

The event was upgraded to a Grade III in 1988. That year the event only attracted three starters with Gulch winning in an upset victory over the 1987 Breeders' Cup Sprint winner and 1/2 odds favorite Very Subtle by a  length margin. Gulch won go on that year and win the Breeders' Cup Sprint and be crowned the U.S. Champion Sprint Horse.

With the seen quality of winners that were winning the American Graded Stakes Committee of the Thoroughbred Owners and Breeders Association upgraded the event to a Grade II in 1997.

Between 1996 and 2007, the Breeders' Cup sponsored the event which reflected in the name of the event.

The event was held on the All Weather synthetic track between 2008 and 2010. On return to holding the event on the dirt track in 2011 the conditions of the event were modified from handicap to an allowance.

In 2015 the administration of the Los Angeles Turf Club rename the event to the Kona Gold Stakes in honor of the dual winner of the event (2000 and 2001) Kona Gold and third placegetter of the 2003 race. Kona Gold had an outstanding record at Santa Anita Park with many wins on the Southern California circuit. His most important win was in the 2000 Breeders' Cup Sprint which was vital in him being awarded the U.S. Champion Sprint Horse.

In 2020 due to the COVID-19 pandemic in the United States, Santa Anita closed their track and the event was cancelled. In 2021 Cezanne defeated three other starters by a new record margin of  lengths breaking a 31 year record that was set by Olympic Prospect in 1990 of seven lengths.

Other fine horses that have won this event and have gone on to win the Breeders' Cup Sprint later in their career include Cardmania, Lit de Justice and Amazombie. The 2002 winner Kalookan Queen is the only mare to have won the event.

Records
Speed record:
1:13.71 – Son Of A Pistol (1998)

Margins:
 lengths – Cezanne (2021)

Most wins:
 2 – Amazombie  (2011, 2012)
 2 – Kona Gold (2000, 2001)

Most wins by a jockey:
 4 – Alex Solis (2000, 2001, 2002, 2006)
 4 – Garrett K. Gomez (1998, 2005, 2010, 2013)

Most wins by a trainer:
 6 – Bruce Headley (1986, 1998, 2000, 2001, 2002, 2006)

Most wins by an owner:
 3 – Aase & Bruce Headley (2000, 2001, 2006)

Winners

Legend:

 
 

Notes:

§ Ran as part of an entry

See also
List of American and Canadian Graded races

References

Graded stakes races in the United States
Open sprint category horse races
Horse races in California
Recurring sporting events established in 1983
Santa Anita Park
1983 establishments in California
Grade 2 stakes races in the United States
Sports competitions in Los Angeles County, California